Þjóðólfr ór Hvini (anglicized as Thjódólf of Hvinir or Thiodolf; fl. late 9th–early 10th c. AD), was a Norwegian skald, said to have been one of the court-poets of the Norwegian king Harald Fairhair. His name suggests that he was from the region of Hvinir (Kvinesdal). Two skaldic poems, Haustlǫng (Autumn-long) and Ynglingatal (Enumeration of the Ynglingar), are generally attributed to him.

Works 
Both Haustlǫng and Ynglingatal are ascribed to Þjóðólfr of Hvinir from a relatively early period. They were preserved, along with some other of his verses, by the 13th-century Icelandic writer Snorri Sturluson in the Prose Edda. A third poem, Hrafnsmál, is also attributed to him by Snorri, although scholars rather think that it was composed by another of Harald Fairhair's court-poets named Þórbjǫrn Hornklofi.

Þjóðólfr composed Ynglingatal for Ragnvald Heidumhære, a chieftain from Vestfold (Oslofjord). The poem tells about the lives of the Ynglingar, a dynasty of kings from Uppsala, and forms the basis for Snorri's Ynglinga saga.

What we have preserved of Haustlǫng is centred on two mythological scenes: Loki's betraying of Iðunn, the Æsir's "old-age cure", who was snatched from them by the jǫtunn Þjazi in eagle form; and Thor's victorious combat against the strongest of the jǫtnar, Hrungnir. If as seems likely it was composed in emulation of Bragi inn gamli's Ragnarsdrápa, it will have had two further episodes.

References

Bibliography 

 
 

10th-century Norwegian poets
Norwegian male poets
Place of birth unknown
Place of death unknown